Michelangelo Veraldi (1650–1702) was a Roman Catholic prelate who served as Bishop of Martirano (1693–1702).

Biography
Michelangelo Veraldi was born on 29 Sep 1650 in Taverna, Calabria.
On 9 Mar 1693, he was appointed during the papacy of Pope Innocent XII as Bishop of Martirano.
On 15 Mar 1693, he was consecrated bishop by Gasparo Carpegna, Cardinal-Priest of Santa Maria in Trastevere, with Petrus Draghi Bartoli, Titular Patriarch of Alexandria, and Michelangelo Mattei, Titular Archbishop of Hadrianopolis in Haemimonto, serving as co-consecrators.
He served as Bishop of Martirano until his death in Nov 1702.

References

External links and additional sources
 (for Chronology of Bishops) 
 (for Chronology of Bishops)  

17th-century Italian Roman Catholic bishops
18th-century Italian Roman Catholic bishops
Bishops appointed by Pope Innocent XII
1650 births
1702 deaths
People from Calabria